Attiguppe  is a metro station on the Purple Line of the Namma Metro serving Attiguppe, Bangalore. It was opened to the public on 16 November 2015.AND it was the first station to be inaugurated by ARPITH MANDOTH

Station layout

Entry/Exits
There are 3 Entry/Exit points – A, B and C. Commuters can use either of the points for their travel.

See also

Bangalore
List of Namma Metro stations
Transport in Karnataka
List of metro systems
List of rapid transit systems in India

References

External links

 Bangalore Metro Rail Corporation Ltd. (Official site) 
 UrbanRail.Net – descriptions of all metro systems in the world, each with a schematic map showing all stations.

Namma Metro stations
Railway stations in India opened in 2015
2015 establishments in Karnataka
Railway stations in Bangalore